Debra Lynn Winger (born May 16, 1955) is an American actress. She starred in the films An Officer and a Gentleman (1982), Terms of Endearment (1983), and Shadowlands (1993), each of which earned her a nomination for the Academy Award for Best Actress. Winger won the National Society of Film Critics Award for Best Actress for Terms of Endearment, and the Tokyo International Film Festival Award for Best Actress for A Dangerous Woman (1993). Her other film roles include Urban Cowboy (1980), Legal Eagles (1986), Black Widow (1987), Betrayed (1988), The Sheltering Sky (1990), Forget Paris (1995), and Rachel Getting Married (2008). In 2012, she made her Broadway debut in the original production of David Mamet's play The Anarchist. In 2014, she received the Lifetime Achievement Award at the Transilvania International Film Festival.

Winger starred as a series regular in the Netflix original television series The Ranch (2016–2020).

Early years
Winger was born in Cleveland Heights, Ohio, into an Orthodox Jewish family, to Robert Winger, a meat packer, and Ruth (née Felder), an office manager. Over the years, she told many interviewers that she volunteered on an Israeli kibbutz, sometimes even saying she had trained with the Israel Defense Forces, but in a 2008 interview she said she was merely on a typical youth tour that visited the kibbutz. At age 18, after returning to the U.S., she was involved in a car accident and suffered a cerebral hemorrhage; as a result, she was left partially paralyzed and blind for 10 months, initially being told that she would never see again. With time on her hands to think about her life, she decided that, if she recovered, she would move to California and become an actress.

Career

Acting 

Winger's first acting role was as "Debbie" in the 1976 sexploitation film Slumber Party '57. Her next role was as Diana Prince's younger sister Drusilla (Wonder Girl) in three episodes of ABC's TV series Wonder Woman. The producers wanted her to appear more often, but she refused, fearing that the role would hurt her fledgling career. This was followed by a guest role in Season 4 of the TV drama Police Woman in 1978. Winger played a supporting role in Willard Huyck's 1979 comic coming-of-age film French Postcards.

Winger's first major role was in Thank God It's Friday, followed by Urban Cowboy in 1980, for which she received a BAFTA nomination and a pair of Golden Globe nominations (for Best Performance by an Actress and Best New Star). In 1982 she co-starred with Nick Nolte in Cannery Row and with Richard Gere in An Officer and a Gentleman, for which she was nominated for the Academy Award for Best Actress. She was nominated for the Academy Award for Best Actress twice more: for Terms of Endearment in 1983 (which was awarded to her co-star, Shirley MacLaine, who played her mother in the film) and for Shadowlands in 1993, for which she also received her second BAFTA nomination. Her performance in A Dangerous Woman earned a Golden Globe nomination for Best Actress.

Over the years Winger acquired a reputation for being outspoken and difficult to work with. She has expressed her dislike of An Officer and a Gentleman, for which she refused to do any publicity, and several of her other films, and has been dismissive of some of her co-stars and directors. When Barbara Walters interviewed Bette Davis in 1986, Davis said, "I see a great deal of myself in Debra Winger."

Winger was to play Peggy Sue in the film Peggy Sue Got Married but was forced to back out just before production began after injuring her back in a bicycle accident. The role went to Kathleen Turner. The injury affected Winger's ability to work for several months. She was cast in A League of Their Own but dropped out and was replaced by Geena Davis. It was later reported that Winger dropped out of the film because she refused to work with Madonna, whom Winger did not consider a serious actress. Other starring roles during this period included Legal Eagles, Made in Heaven, Everybody Wins, The Sheltering Sky, Leap of Faith, Black Widow, Betrayed, Wilder Napalm, and A Dangerous Woman.

In 1995 Winger decided to take a hiatus from acting. In 2002 she said, "I wanted out for years. I got sick of hearing myself say I wanted to quit. It's like opening an interview with 'I hate interviews!' Well, get out! I stopped reading scripts and stopped caring. People said, 'We miss you so much.' But in the last six years, tell me a film that I should have been in. The few I can think of, the actress was so perfect". After making Forget Paris in 1995, she was absent from the screen for six years before returning in 2001 with Big Bad Love, written and directed by her husband, Arliss Howard. The film was also Winger's debut as a producer.

During her film hiatus, Winger had the female lead in the American Repertory Theater's stage production of Anton Chekhov's play Ivanov from November 1999 to January 2000.

Rosanna Arquette made a critically acclaimed documentary film, Searching for Debra Winger, that was released in 2002 after Winger returned to film acting. Winger subsequently starred in the films Radio, Eulogy, and Sometimes in April, and received positive reviews for portraying Anne Hathaway's estranged mother in Rachel Getting Married.

Winger earned an Emmy Award nomination for her title role as the mother of a Columbine shooting victim in the 2005 television film Dawn Anna, directed by Arliss Howard. In 2010 she returned to television, making a guest appearance as a high school principal in an episode of Law & Order. She also joined the cast of HBO's In Treatment as one of the three patients featured in the third season.

In 2013 Winger starred in three episodes of In the Woods, the first installment of Jennifer Elster's multimedia, experimental film series The Being Experience, also including Terrence Howard, Dave Matthews, Rufus Wainwright, Karen Black, Will Shortz, Liya Kebede, Questlove, Famke Janssen, Moby, Gale Harold, Paz de la Huerta, Jorgen Leth, Rosie Perez, Aubrey de Grey, and Alan Cumming.

From 2016 to 2020, Winger starred opposite Sam Elliott and Ashton Kutcher in the Netflix multi-cam comedy The Ranch.

In 2017, Winger had a cameo as Supreme Court Justice Elena Kagan in the TV miniseries When We Rise. The same year, she starred in her first romantic lead after many years in The Lovers.  She has continued to acquire roles in other feature films, such as Tiger City, released in 2018.

Other pursuits

In 1995, Winger performed in The Wizard of Oz in Concert: Dreams Come True, a television musical performance of the popular 1939 MGM film at Lincoln Center to benefit the Children's Defense Fund. Her roles in that special were the "Cyclone" narrator and the Wicked Witch of the West. It was originally broadcast on both TBS and TNT.

During her hiatus from the film industry, Winger spent a semester as a teaching fellow at Harvard University. In 2008, she wrote a book, Undiscovered, based on her personal recollections. She has shown her support for reconciliation between Arabs and Jews in Israel by visiting the bilingual Hand in Hand schools (Galilee Jewish-Arab School, Gesher al HaWadi School) where, in 2008, she said she would "dedicate the next bit of my life to these schools".

As president of the 2009 Zurich Film Festival jury, Winger joined other members of the Hollywood film community to speak out against the arrest and prosecution of director Roman Polanski, who was convicted of raping a 13-year-old girl in the 1970s, criticizing Switzerland's government for "philistine collusion" in arresting him so many years later, as he was en route to attend the Zurich festival.

In 2010, Winger was co-executive producer of the Academy Award-nominated documentary Gasland. She was also the executive producer of the 2012 documentary Bel Borba Aqui, about the life and works of Brazilian graphic artist Bel Borba.

Personal life
Winger's three-year relationship with actor Andrew Rubin ended in 1980. From 1983 to 1985 she dated Bob Kerrey, at the time the governor of Nebraska, whom she met while filming Terms of Endearment in Lincoln, Nebraska. Winger has also dated her Cannery Row and Everybody Wins co-star Nick Nolte.

From 1986 to 1990, Winger was married to actor Timothy Hutton, with whom she had a son, Noah Hutton, a documentary filmmaker born in 1987. The marriage ended in divorce.

In 1996, Winger married actor/director Arliss Howard, whom she met on the set of the film Wilder Napalm. Their son, Gideon Babe Ruth Howard (known as Babe), was born in 1997. She is stepmother to Sam Howard, Arliss's son from his prior marriage.

Filmography

Film

Television

References

External links 
 
 Transcript of Radio 4 interview
 

20th-century American actresses
21st-century American actresses
Actresses from Cleveland
American film actresses
American television actresses
California State University, Northridge alumni
Harvard Fellows
Jewish American actresses
Living people
Audiobook narrators
21st-century American Jews
1955 births